The Movement for Social Justice (MSJ) is a socialist political party in Trinidad and Tobago founded in March 2009. Its logo is the Scales of Justice. Its current leader is David Abdulah, a former government senator and general secretary of the Oilfields Workers' Trade Union.

The MSJ party was part of the People's Partnership alliance for the 2010 general elections, but did not contest under its own name and has since parted ways with the PP. The party held its Founding Congress on May 14, 2011.

In October 2012 the MSJ launched a think-tank called the Foundation for Social Justice, which aims to promote ideals of social justice, equity and participatory democracy through seminars, research, publication, advocacy and campaigns.

References

External links
Official website
Facebook
Stuart Trew, "A progressive social movement takes root in Trinidad", The Council of Canadians, 17 May 2011.

Foro de São Paulo
Political parties established in 2009
Political parties in Trinidad and Tobago